Necip Okaner (1889 Kadıköy, Istanbul – 28 July 1959, Izmir) was a Turkish navy officer, footballer and academician. He was among the principal founders of the major Turkish multi-sport club Fenerbahçe SK.

Necip Okaner, Ziya Songülen and Ayetullah Bey met at Okaner's residence, which was located at Beşbıyık street in the Moda, Kadıköy quarter, where the club was officially founded as Fenerbahçe Futbol Kulübü (Fenerbahçe Football Club).

Necip Okaner, in 1907 graduated from the Naval Academy (Turkey) and became a marine lieutenant. In 1909 he was promoted to the rank of lieutenant and brought to the Naval Forces. Between 1912-1913, he took torpedo training in the Royal Navy. When he returned to Istanbul, he was promoted to the rank of captain. Between 1914-1916 he worked as a mine teacher. In 1916, he studied for six weeks at the Imperial German Navy

Necip Bey, after resigning from the army; was an English professor at Ege University School of Foreign Languages. He died in 1959. He was buried in Kokluca Cemetery in Bornova, İzmir.

References

1959 deaths
Turkish footballers
Fenerbahçe S.K. footballers
1892 births
Association football defenders
People from Kadıköy
Footballers from Istanbul
Turkish Navy officers
Military personnel from Istanbul
Turkish academics